Palma is a municipality in the southeastern part of the state of Minas Gerais, Brazil.

Districts

Cisneiros
Itapiruçu 
Palma

References

External links
http://www.palma.mg.gov.br (in Portuguese)
http://www.citybrazil.com.br/mg/palma/ (in Portuguese)

Municipalities in Minas Gerais